The following lists events that happened during 2010 in Republic of Albania.

Incumbents 
 President: Bamir Topi
 Prime Minister: Sali Berisha
 Deputy Prime Minister: Ilir Meta

Events

November 
 European Union rejects Albania's request for EU candidate status, but eases visa requirements for Albanians.

Deaths 
 19 January - Panajot Pano, Albanian football player
 28 March - Agim Qirjaqi, Albanian actor and television director
 5 June - Esma Agolli,  Albanian actress of stage and screen

See also
 2010 in Albanian television

References

External links

 
Years of the 21st century in Albania
2010s in Albania